Alien invasion or space invasion is a common feature in science fiction stories and film, in which extraterrestrial lifeforms invade the Earth to exterminate and supplant human life, enslave it, harvest people for food, steal the planet's resources, or destroy the planet altogether. It can be considered as a science-fiction subgenre of the invasion literature, expanded by H. G. Wells's seminal alien invasion novel The War of the Worlds.

Experts consider the prospects of an actual invasion of Earth by extraterrestrials to be extremely unlikely, due to the enormous cost in time and resources.

Origins

In 1892, Robert Potter, an Australian clergyman, published The Germ Growers in London. It describes a covert invasion by aliens who take on the appearance of human beings and attempt to develop a virulent disease to assist in their plans for global conquest. It was not widely read, and consequently H. G. Wells' vastly more successful novel is generally credited as the seminal alien invasion story.

In 1898, Wells published The War of the Worlds, depicting the invasion of Victorian England by Martians equipped with advanced weaponry. It is now seen as the seminal alien invasion story and Wells is credited with establishing several extraterrestrial themes which were later greatly expanded by science fiction writers in the 20th century, including first contact and war between planets and their differing species. However, there were stories of aliens and alien invasion prior to publication of The War of the Worlds.

Wells had already proposed another outcome for the alien invasion story in The War of the Worlds. When the Narrator meets the artilleryman the second time, the artilleryman imagines a future where humanity, hiding underground in sewers and tunnels, conducts a guerrilla war, fighting against the Martians for generations to come, and eventually, after learning how to duplicate Martian weapon technology, destroys the invaders and takes back the Earth.

Six weeks after publication of the novel, The Boston Post newspaper published another alien invasion story, an unauthorized sequel to The War of the Worlds, which turned the tables on the invaders. Edison's Conquest of Mars was written by Garrett P. Serviss, who described the famous inventor Thomas Edison leading a counterattack against the invaders on their home soil. Though this is actually a sequel to Fighters from Mars, a revised and unauthorised reprint of War of the Worlds, they both were first printed in The Boston Post in 1898.

The War of the Worlds was reprinted in the United States in 1927, a year after the Golden Age of Science Fiction was created by Hugo Gernsback in Amazing Stories. John W. Campbell, another key editor of the era, and periodic short story writer, published several alien invasion stories in the 1930s. Many well-known science fiction writers were to follow, including Isaac Asimov, Arthur C. Clarke, Clifford D. Simak, plus Robert A. Heinlein who wrote The Puppet Masters in 1951.

Variations

Alien infiltration
This is a familiar variation on the alien invasion theme. In the infiltration scenario, the invaders will typically take human form and can move freely throughout human society, even to the point of taking control of command positions. The purpose of this may either be to take over the entire world through infiltration (Invasion of the Body Snatchers), or as advanced scouts meant to "soften up" Earth in preparation for a full-scale invasion by the aliens' conventional military (First Wave). This type of invasion represented common fears of the American public during the Cold War, particularly the fear of infiltration by communist agents.

Beneficial alien invasion

This theme has also been explored in fiction on the rare occasion. With this type of story, the invaders, in a kind of little grey/green man's burden, colonize the planet in an effort to spread their culture and "civilize" the indigenous "barbaric" inhabitants or secretly watch and aid earthlings saving them from themselves. The former theme shares many traits with hostile occupation fiction, but the invaders tend to view the occupied peoples as students or equals rather than subjects and slaves. The latter theme of secret watcher is a paternalistic/maternalistic theme. In this fiction, the aliens intervene in human affairs to prevent them from destroying themselves, such as Klaatu and Gort in The Day the Earth Stood Still warning the leaders of Earth to abandon their warlike ways and join other space-faring civilizations else that they will destroy themselves or be destroyed by their interstellar union. Other examples of a beneficial alien invasion are Gene Roddenberry's movie The Questor Tapes (1974) and his Star Trek episode "Assignment: Earth" (1968); Arthur C. Clarke's Childhood's End, the novel (later anime) series Crest of the Stars, the film Arrival (2016), and David Brin's Uplift Universe series of books.

Invasion by humans 
A similar trope depicts humans in the role of the "alien" invaders, where humans are the ones invading or attacking extraterrestrial lifeforms. Examples include the short story Sentry (1954) (in which the "aliens" described are, at the end, explained to be humans), the video game Phantasy Star II (1989), The Martian Chronicles by Ray Bradbury, the Imperium of Man in the Warhammer 40,000 universe, Invaders from Earth by Robert Silverberg, Ender's Game by Orson Scott Card, and the movies Battle for Terra (2007), Planet 51 (2009), Avatar (2009) and Mars Needs Moms (2011).

See also 
 First contact
 Interplanetary contamination
 Space colonization
 UFO religion
 The Kraken Wakes, 1953 novel

References 

 
Apocalyptic fiction
Science fiction genres
Science fiction themes
Fiction about space warfare